San Jerónimo is a port of entry in the Mexican state of Chihuahua, across the U.S. border from Santa Teresa, New Mexico. It is located in the municipality of Juárez, and is an alternative to the busy crossings between El Paso, Texas, and Ciudad Juárez, Chihuahua. It is principally used for the livestock industry and is the location of a large stockyard.

The original port of entry was opened in 1992 by a binational agreement.

The Santa Teresa Port of Entry is open 7 days a week from 6 AM to 10 PM.

References

External links 
 Union Ganadera Regional de Chihuahua homepage
 San Jeronimo - The Most Interesting City in the Americas

Mexico–United States border crossings